Brignolia nigripalpis is a species of spiders of the genus Brignolia. It is native to India and Sri Lanka.

See also
 List of Oonopidae species

References

Spiders described in 1893
Oonopidae
Spiders of Asia